Meclorisone (developmental code name NSC-92353) is a synthetic glucocorticoid corticosteroid which was never marketed.

References

Chloroarenes
Diketones
Diols
Glucocorticoids
Pregnanes
Abandoned drugs